Boy Meets Girl is an ITV comedy-drama television miniseries starring Rachael Stirling and Martin Freeman. In the show, Danny Reed (Freeman) is struck by lightning.  When he wakes up from the attack, he is inside the body of a woman, fashion journalist Veronica Burton (Stirling). Written by David Allison, the series began on 1 May 2009.

Synopsis
Danny Reed (Martin Freeman) is directionless and dissatisfied with his lot in life.  Working at a DIY superstore, he vents his frustrations on the customers when not pining for his co-worker Fiona (Angela Griffin), or foisting his encyclopedic knowledge of useless information onto loyal friend Pete (Marshall Lancaster).  He is a world away from the successful and vivacious Veronica (Rachael Stirling), whose job as a glamorous fashion journalist provides her with a well-stocked bank account and an even better-stocked social calendar.  Worshipped by her devoted boyfriend, Jay (Paterson Joseph), Veronica seems to have it all.  When a freak accident traps the mismatched strangers in each other's bodies, the results are not pretty.

As Danny and Veronica struggle with their new identities they begin to discover new truths about themselves. But besides learning to walk in high heels or being forced to 'slum it' with the working classes, the pair long to get back to their own bodies and, ultimately, their old lives.

Cast

Episodes

Ratings

DVD release
The series was released on 25 May 2009.  The front cover is a photo of Danny and Veronica sitting on a park bench, looking at each other in confusion.  Above them is the logo for the show. And the slogan below it reads "ever had one of those days when you're not feeling yourself?". The age certificate for the DVD is 15.

References

2009 British television series debuts
2009 British television series endings
British comedy-drama television shows
ITV comedy
ITV television dramas